Beslan Airport , also known as Vladikavkaz International Airport, is a civilian airport in North Ossetia–Alania, Russia located  northeast of Beslan and  from Vladikavkaz. It is a small airport servicing medium-sized airliners. It has parking places for five large aircraft and nine smaller ones. In 2017, 349,684 passengers transited in this airport.

The airport has two terminals, one domestic and one international. The international terminal serves occasional charter flights to Antalya (Turkey) and a few other destinations.

The airport’s operational hours are from 09h00 to 20h00 (UTC+03:00).

On 18 November 2008, the airport was certified to service the Airbus A319. This type of aircraft will replace the Tupolev Tu-154 on S7 Airlines services to Moscow-Domodedovo. The A319 is ideal for flights to Vladikavkaz because it exerts an acceptable load on the runway during takeoff and landing compared to the Boeing 737-500, which type was banned from the airport in 2007.

Airlines and destinations

References

External links
 Beslan Airport official website 

Airports built in the Soviet Union
Airports in North Ossetia–Alania
Vladikavkaz